David Lazzaroni (born 4 February 1985 in Échirolles) is a French ski jumper who has competed since 2002. At the 2010 Winter Olympics in Vancouver, he finished ninth in the team large hill, 34th in the team large hill, and 47th in the individual normal hill events.

Lazzaroni's best finish at the FIS Nordic World Ski Championships was eighth in the team large hill event at Liberec in 2009.

His best World Cup finish was seventh in an HS 128 event at Norway in 2008.

References

External links
 
 
 

1985 births
French male ski jumpers
French people of Italian descent
Living people
Olympic ski jumpers of France
People from Échirolles
Ski jumpers at the 2010 Winter Olympics
Sportspeople from Isère